The Most Serene House of Bourbon-Condé, named after Condé-en-Brie now in the Aisne , was a French princely house and a cadet branch of the House of Bourbon. The name of the house was derived from the title of Prince of Condé (French: prince de Condé) that was originally assumed around 1557 by the French Protestant leader, Louis de Bourbon (1530–1569), uncle of King Henry IV of France, and borne by his male-line descendants.

This line became extinct in 1830 when his eighth-generation descendant, Louis Henri Joseph de Bourbon, died without surviving male issue. The princely title was held for one last time by Louis d'Orléans, Prince of Condé, who died in 1866.

History
The Princes of Condé descend from the Vendôme family – the progenitors of the modern House of Bourbon. There was never a principality, sovereign or vassal, of Condé. The name merely served as the territorial source of a title adopted by Louis, who inherited from his father, Charles IV de Bourbon, duc de Vendôme (1489–1537), the lordship of Condé-en-Brie in Champagne, consisting of the Château of Condé and a dozen villages some fifty miles east of Paris.

It had passed from the sires of Avesnes, to the Counts of St. Pol. When Marie de Luxembourg-St. Pol wed François, Count of Vendôme (1470–1495) in 1487, Condé-en-Brie became part of the Bourbon-Vendôme patrimony.

Duc de Bourbon
After the extinction in 1527 of the Dukes of Bourbon, François's son Charles (1489–1537) became head of the House of Bourbon, which traces its male-line descent from Robert, Count of Clermont (1256–1318), a younger son of France's Saint-King Louis IX. Of the sons of Charles of Vendôme, the eldest, Antoine, became jure uxoris King of Navarre and fathered Henry IV.

The youngest son, Louis, inherited the lordships of Meaux, Nogent, Condé, and Soissons as his appanage. Louis was titled Prince of Condé in a parliamentary document on 15 January 1557 and, without any legal authority beyond their dignity as princes of the Blood Royal, they continued to bear it for the next three centuries.  He was succeeded by his son Henri I de Bourbon, prince de Condé.

Louis, the first Prince, actually gave the Condé property to his youngest son, Charles (1566–1612), Count of Soissons. Charles' only son Louis (1604–1641) left Condé and Soissons to female heirs in 1624, who married into the Savoy and Orléans-Longueville dynasties.

Monsieur le Prince
Upon the accession to France's throne of Henry IV of Bourbon in 1589, his first cousin-once-removed Henry, Prince of Condé (1588–1646), was heir presumptive to the crown until 1601. Although Henry's own descendants thereafter held the senior positions within the royal family of dauphin, Fils de France, and petits-fils de France, from 1589 to 1709 the Princes of Condé coincidentally held the rank at court of premier prince du sang royal (First Prince of the Blood Royal), to which was attached income, precedence, and ceremonial privilege (such as the exclusive right to be addressed as Monsieur le prince at court).

However, the position of premier prince devolved upon the ducs d'Orléans in 1710, so the seventh Prince, Louis III (1668–1710) declined to make use of the title, preferring instead to be known by his hereditary peerage of Duke of Bourbon, which still afforded him the right to be known as Monsieur le Duc. Subsequent heirs likewise preferred the ducal to the princely title.

Later
After the death of Henry III Jules de Bourbon, prince de Condé in 1709, the family were in regular attendance at court.  Louis de Bourbon-Condé (at that point known as the Duke of Bourbon) had in 1685 married Louise-Françoise de Bourbon, the legitimated daughter of Louis XIV of France and Françoise-Athénaïs, marquise de Montespan.

The couple had many children and produced an heir to the Condé titles and lands. Their son was Louis Henri de Bourbon-Condé, duc de Bourbon.
He led a quiet life and was known at court as Monsieur le Duc after the loss of the rank of premier prince du sang in 1723. After his death the family retreated from court life but Louis Joseph de Bourbon, prince de Condé was vital in the forming of the Army of Condé - formed to support his cousin Louis XVI during his imprisonment during the revolution. He was the longest holder of the title, being known as the prince de Condé for seventy-eight years.

His son married the sister of Louis Philippe II d'Orléans better known as Philippe Égalité. She was called Louise Marie Thérèse Bathilde d'Orléans. She was the last princesse de Condé and mother of Louis-Antoine-Henri de Bourbon-Condé - titled duc d'Enghien. He was executed by Napoleon I of France at the Château de Vincennes. With the death of the duc d'Enghien, the heir to the Condé name, his father was the last holder of the title.

After his death in 1830 the Condé lands passed to the last prince's cousin Henri Eugène Philippe Louis d'Orléans, duc d'Aumale whose eldest son Louis was later a prince de Condé after gaining the title from his father.

Family tree

Cadet branches

House of Bourbon-Conti

The House of Bourbon-Conti was formed in 1581 by François de Bourbon, prince de Conti. He was the son of Louis I de Bourbon, prince de Condé. The house became extinct in 1814 upon the death of Louis François II de Bourbon, prince de Conti.

The Princes of Conti were as follows:
 1558–1614: marquis, then from 1581 onwards 1st prince François de Bourbon.

At his death, the title became extinct because the prince died without issue. The title was assumed in 1629 by:

 1629–1666: 2nd prince Armand de Bourbon-Conti
 1666–1685: 3rd prince Louis Armand I de Bourbon-Conti
 1685–1709: 4th prince Francis Louis de Bourbon-Conti
 1709–1727: 5th prince Louis Armand II de Bourbon-Conti
 1727–1776: 6th prince Louis Francis I de Bourbon-Conti
 1776–1814: 7th prince Louis Francis II de Bourbon-Conti

House of Bourbon-Soissons

The first prince de Conti was also the brother of the founder of the House of Bourbon-Soissons, Charles de Bourbon-Soissons. The comtes de Soissons were addressed at court as Monsieur le Comte and their wives as Madame la Comtesse. The members of the house were:

 1487–1495: François de Bourbon-Vendôme (1470–1495);
 1495–1537: Charles de Bourbon-Vendôme (1489–1537), comte (jure matris), son of the preceding;
 1547–1557: Jean de Bourbon-Soissons  (1528–1557), son of the preceding;
 1557–1569: Louis I de Bourbon, prince de Condé (1535–1569), brother of the preceding;
 1569–1612: Charles de Bourbon, comte de Soissons  (1566–1612), son of the preceding;
 1612–1641: Louis de Bourbon, comte de Soissons (1604–1641), son of the preceding;
 1641–1656: Marie de Bourbon-Soissons (1606–1692), sister of the preceding.

The line started in 1566 when the title of Count of Soissons was given to Charles de Bourbon-Condé, the second son of Louis I de Bourbon, prince de Condé, the first Prince of Condé. The Soissons title had been acquired by the first Prince of Condé in 1557 and was held by his descendants for two more generations with Charles de Bourbon-Condé, 1st comte de Soissons, and Louis de Bourbon-Condé, 2nd comte de Soissons.

The 2nd comte de Soissons died without an heir, so the Soissons estates passed to his younger sister, Marie de Bourbon-Condé, the wife of Thomas Francis, Prince of Carignano, a younger brother of the sovereign Duke of Savoy. Although she received 400,000 livres in annual revenues from the Soissons estates, lived in the Hôtel de Soissons where, according to Saint-Simon, she "maintained the traditions of the Soissons", she continued to be known as the princesse de Carignan. On her death, the Soissons countship passed first to her second son, Prince Joseph-Emmanuel of Savoy-Carignano (1631–1656), and then to her third son, Prince Eugène-Maurice of Savoy-Carignano. He married Olympia Mancini, niece of Cardinal Mazarin. She was known as Madame la Comtesse de Soissons. On his death, the title went to his eldest son, Prince Louis Thomas of Savoy-Carignano, who was the older brother of the famous Austrian general, Prince Eugene of Savoy. The Soissons countship became extinct upon the death of Prince Eugène-Jean-François of Savoy-Carignano in 1734.

Princes of Condé

First creation: 1546–1830 – House of Bourbon

Second creation: 1845 –1866 – House of Orléans

Addresses
The eldest sons of the Princes of Condé used the title of Duke of Enghien, and were addressed as Monsieur le Duc until that style came to be pre-empted by their fathers, as Dukes of Bourbon, after 1709. The Princes of Condé were also the male-line ancestors of the branches of the Princes of Conti, which flourished 1629–1814, and of the Counts of Soissons, 1566–1641.

Although both the sons and daughters of these branches of the House of Bourbon held the rank of princes and princesses du sang, it never became the custom in France for them to use prince or princess as a prefix to their Christian names. Rather, sons took a title of French nobility, count or duke, suffixed with their appanage (e.g. Count of Charolais), while unmarried daughters used one of their fathers' subsidiary properties to form a courtesy style, e.g. "mademoiselle de Clermont".

Condé residences

The Hôtel de Condé became the Parisian base of the Condé family in 1610, in what is now the 6th district of Paris. In 1722 Louise-Françoise de Bourbon, wife of Louis III of Condé, started building the Palais Bourbon which in 1764 became the Condé family's main Parisian residence. They sold the former Hôtel de Condé to the King in 1770, and it was demolished around 1780 to be replaced by a new neighborhood around the theater that later became known as the Odéon. Another Parisian property, still known as the Hôtel de Bourbon-Condé (12 rue Monsieur), was built and inhabited between 1780 and 1789 by Louise Adélaïde de Bourbon-Condé. 

The family had several residences outside Paris: the Château de Condé in Condé-en-Brie, Picardy, which they ceased to own by 1624; the Château de Vallery, built from 1548 for the Marshal of Saint André, acquired by Louis I de Condé in 1564 and kept by the family until 1747; and the Château de Chantilly, previously a Montmorency property from 1484 to 1632 and a Condé estate from then. The latter was the home of the Grand Condé during his exile from court, and the host château of a party given in honour of King Louis XIV of France in 1671. It was confiscated during the French Revolution and eventually came into the possession of King Louis Philippe of France, who gave it to his youngest son, Henri d'Orléans, duc d'Aumale.

References

 
 
Conde
1557 establishments in France
1830 disestablishments in France